Kevin Ferguson (February 8, 1974 – June 6, 2016), better known as Kimbo Slice, was a Bahamian mixed martial artist, boxer, bare-knuckle boxer, professional wrestler, and actor. He became noted for his role in mutual combat street fight videos which were spread online, leading Rolling Stone to call him "The King of the Web Brawlers".

Slice left the underground fighting scene and signed a professional contract with EliteXC in 2007. He competed in The Ultimate Fighter: Heavyweights, where he lost in his first fight to eventual series winner Roy Nelson. In his UFC debut, Slice defeated Houston Alexander in The Ultimate Fighter: Heavyweights finale. In January 2015, he signed a contract with Bellator MMA. He died suddenly in 2016.

Early life
Kimbo Slice was born Kevin Ferguson in Nassau on February 8, 1974. He moved to the U.S. as a child and grew up in Cutler Ridge, Florida. He was raised with his brother Devon and sister Renea by his mother Rosemary Clarke. He went to Bel-Air Elementary School, where he was reportedly involved in his first fight with fellow student Dominic Sauer at the age of 13 as he tried to defend a friend. Ferguson continued his studies at Cutler Ridge Middle School and later attended Richmond Heights Middle School. He attended Miami Palmetto High School, where he was the star middle linebacker. In 1992, his house in Perrine, Florida was destroyed by Hurricane Andrew, forcing him to live in his 1987 Nissan Pathfinder for a month.

For college, Ferguson attended both Bethune-Cookman University and the University of Miami, where he held an athletic scholarship and studied criminal justice. He was there for a year and a half. In 1997, he had a tryout with the Miami Dolphins and was part of the pre-season squad but was unable to secure a spot on the first team. Slice's cousin is United States judoka Rhadi Ferguson.

Early career
Ferguson started working as a bouncer for a strip club until high school friend and career-long manager, Mike Imber, offered him a job as a limousine driver and bodyguard for RK Netmedia, better known as Reality Kings, a Miami-based pornography production/promotion company responsible for a number of popular adult subscription websites. Ferguson maintained close ties with Reality Kings throughout the rest of his life; company representatives accompanied him, as his fight entourage, under the name Team Kimbo.

In 2002, he was charged with carrying a concealed weapon and in 2003, he began his career in unsanctioned mutual combat street fights. They were distributed through the Internet, mainly through the adult website SublimeDirectory and various other video platforms. In his first taped fight against a man named Big D, Ferguson left a large cut on his opponent's right eye which led Internet fans to call him Slice, becoming the last name to his already popular childhood nickname, Kimbo.

Mixed martial arts career
In 2005, Slice started training in martial arts at the Freestyle Fighting Academy under Marcos Avellan and David Avellan. At first, Slice was training exclusively for illegal street boxing, focusing on bare-knuckle techniques, dirty boxing from the clinch, and elbows — but then he began to develop an interest for MMA. Slice signed to make his MMA debut against former WBO Heavyweight champion and Olympic gold-medalist boxer Ray Mercer at Cage Fury Fighting Championships 5, in Atlantic City on June 23, 2007. A month prior to the fight, Slice switched camps and was trained by retired MMA fighter Bas Rutten and boxing instructor Randy Khatami at Rutten's school, EliteMMA, in Thousand Oaks, California.

Slice made his MMA debut against Mercer at Cage Fury Fighting Championships 5, in Atlantic City on June 23, 2007. The match was scheduled as a three-round exhibition utilizing all professional rules of MMA combat. Slice defeated Mercer with a guillotine choke at 1:12 into the first round. CFFC V sold 20,000 ppv buys In a post-fight interview, Slice stated that he would like to fight David "Tank" Abbott. Abbott, who was a spectator, stood up from his seat and accepted the call out. One of the matchmakers for CFFC asked Slice for his assurance so that an October 12 bout at Cage Fury Fighting Championships 6 between Slice and "Tank" Abbott could be organized. This event was later canceled due to a promotion dispute. On October 11, 2007, ProElite announced that they had signed Slice to a deal and that he would make his debut on the November 10, 2007 EliteXC. He was originally set to make his professional MMA debut against Mike Bourke, a reformed street fighter, but a shoulder injury from Bourke led him to face Bo Cantrell. Slice defeated Cantrell 19 seconds into the first round by submission due to strikes.

Elite XC
On February 16, 2008, Slice fought Tank Abbott in the main event at EliteXC: Street Certified. He won by KO 43 seconds into the first round due to strikes.

On May 31, 2008, Slice fought in the main event of the first ever mixed martial arts event shown on prime time network television, EliteXC: Primetime. Though one of the judges had each fighter winning one of the first two rounds, Slice's opponent James Thompson won both on total points by repeatedly taking down Slice and grounding and pounding. In the opening seconds of the third round, however, Slice threw a haymaker to Thompson's left ear, which ruptured Thompson's cauliflower. This was soon followed by three unanswered punches to a standing Thompson, which led to a referee stoppage and the controversial win for Slice. Fellow EliteXC competitor Brett Rogers was particularly critical of Slice's victory, calling Slice's performance "garbage" in a post fight interview. Frank Mir was also a critic of Slice, stating in an interview that "every time Kimbo Slice fights, it sets (mixed martial arts) back".

On October 4, 2008, a Kimbo Slice vs. Ken Shamrock fight was supposed to take place at the BankAtlantic Center in Sunrise, Florida as part of CBS' Saturday Night Fights. However, Shamrock received a cut to the left eye during a warm-up only hours before the fight was to take place. This left the head of fight operations, Jeremy Lappen, to choose a replacement for the fight. Options were Seth Petruzelli, Aaron Rosa and Frank Shamrock. Slice's team stated they did not want him fighting Frank no matter how much money was offered to them, so Lappen decided that Petruzelli was the best option for the main event. Slice agreed to take the fight after receiving a raise in pay, and took in $500,000. Petruzelli defeated Slice by TKO 14 seconds into the first round of the bout.

Interviewed on Orlando radio show The Monsters in the Morning two days after the fight, Seth Petruzelli said that when they offered him a spot in the main event, EliteXC promoters added monetary incentives to dissuade him from using certain fighting techniques against Slice, in an attempt to protect their relatively unproven Internet star.

This added to the controversy surrounding the representation of Slice as a top flight martial artist by CBS and EliteXC. The Florida Department of Business and Professional Regulation started a preliminary investigation on the events surrounding the fight and its outcome.

However, Petruzelli retracted this statement a few hours later, claiming in a follow-up interview with MMA website FiveOuncesofPain.com that his previous comments on The Monsters had been misinterpreted.

On October 23, 2008, the Florida Department of Business and Professional Regulation concluded its investigation of the bout and found no wrongdoing. By the end of October 2008, EliteXC was forced to file for bankruptcy. Many in the mixed martial arts community, including Jay Thompson, executive consultant to the company, attributed EliteXC and ProElite's failure due to Slice's loss to Seth Petruzelli.

Ultimate Fighting Championship
After Elite Xtreme Combat ceased operations, Dana White stated that if Slice wanted to compete in the Ultimate Fighting Championship he would have to win his way in by competing on The Ultimate Fighter TV show. White went on to say that he might create a show with heavyweights just for Kimbo Slice if he wanted in. That statement became reality on June 1, when Kevin Iole of Yahoo.com stated Slice would participate in The Ultimate Fighter: Heavyweights.

The coaches for the show were Quinton Jackson and Rashad Evans, both former UFC Light Heavyweight Champions. Slice was the number one pick for coach Rampage and the second pick overall. In his first fight of the show, Slice was defeated by Roy Nelson via TKO stoppage in the second round after repeated punches to the head in the crucifix position. Slice later turned down the opportunity to take Matt Mitrione's place in the quarter finals after it was revealed that he had arthritis in his knee.

Slice fought Houston Alexander on December 5, 2009, at The Ultimate Fighter: Heavyweights Finale at a catchweight of 215 pounds. In a fight that many thought would not leave the first round, Alexander would instead spend most of the first and third rounds circling Slice tentatively with little engagement. In the second round, however, Slice managed to land punches that visibly hurt Alexander, and even took him down a couple of times including slamming Alexander on his upper body, which very well may have tipped the judges' scorecards in his favor. Slice would win the bout by unanimous decision (29–28, 29–28, and 30–27) and Alexander would be cut from the promotion only days later.

On May 8, 2010, Slice made his pay-per-view and official heavyweight debut at UFC 113 versus Matt Mitrione, losing in the second round via a TKO. Following the loss, Dana White stated that it was "probably Kimbo's last fight in the UFC". His release was confirmed the following day, alongside welterweight Paul Daley.

Bellator MMA

On January 16, 2015, nearly five years since his last MMA fight, Bellator MMA announced that Slice had signed a multi-fight deal. He defeated Ken Shamrock by first-round TKO in his June 19 debut at Bellator 138. Some observers noted the fight appeared to be fixed, like a professional wrestling match. Bellator commentator Jimmy Smith accredited the fight looking as it did to Shamrock's lack of technique and durability, and said if it was fixed, Bellator wasn't in on the deal.

On February 19, 2016, at Bellator 149, Slice faced Dada 5000. The duo had a big rivalry between them due to their old street fight legacies they had in Perrine, Florida. In the first round, both fighters gassed out almost immediately, and Slice went on to win an uneventful fight via TKO when Dada collapsed from apparent exhaustion in the third round. Following the bout it was reported that Slice had failed his pre-fight drug test. Lab results found traces of the anabolic steroid nandrolone. He was also found to have an elevated testosterone/epitestosterone (T/E) ratio of 6.4:1, which is above the maximum allowed limit of 4:1. On May 2, 2016, it was revealed that Slice had settled with the Texas Athletic Commission with a fine of $2,500 and a revoking of his license in the state of Texas. The result of the bout has also been changed to a no contest. Despite being widely panned by critics, the fight attracted approximately 2.5 million viewing households, breaking the Bellator record of 2.4 million, set by Kimbo vs Shamrock.

In April 2016, Bellator President Scott Coker announced on ESPN's SportsCenter that Slice would have a rematch against James Thompson in the main event of Bellator 158, which would take place on July 16, 2016 at London's O2 Arena. Slice died of heart failure before this fight could happen.

Boxing career
In August 2010, Slice announced his intention to become a professional boxer. He stated "I feel like a baby all over again. I'm thinking about this at night. I'm gonna be a problem in the heavyweight division. I'm going to be coming in with a bad demeanor. I want to see what it's like to break some ribs, break a jaw with one punch. This is a career move. I love fighting. I like to knock people the fuck out. I love engaging. Maybe some people think I'm crazy."

Roy Jones Jr. had said he would like to fight Slice, but that Slice would likely need a number of boxing matches beforehand in order to gain experience and exposure in the sport.

Slice made his pro boxing debut on August 13, 2011. Slice fought in a four-round headlining attraction against 39-year-old James Wade (0-1) at the Buffalo Run Casino in Miami, Oklahoma.
He won the fight via KO at 0:10 in the first round.

On October 15, Slice returned to the boxing ring, defeating Tay Bledsoe (2-3) via KO in the first round. On December 30, he defeated Charles Hackmann (0-1) by unanimous decision, winning three out of four rounds.

Slice's next fight was in Australia on the Anthony Mundine vs Daniel Geale undercard on January 30, 2013. He defeated Shane Tilyard (6-6) by TKO in the second round.

Professional wrestling
Slice was to make his debut in professional wrestling on February 5, 2011, against former sumo wrestler Shinichi Suzukawa at the Inoki Genome Federation's "Genome 14" event in Fukuoka, Japan; he pulled out of the match due to getting injured during practice.

Other media coverage
A series called "Junk Yard Training" was released on yardbarker.com and youtube.com that featured LaDainian Tomlinson, running back for the San Diego Chargers, training in Kimbo's backyard. In 2009, Kimbo starred in an antivirus software advertisement called Caterpillar vs. Kimbo.

Slice was featured on The Iron Ring, a television series airing on BET that features MMA prospects. Slice was part of the selection process for the participants. He made his official acting debut when playing the character Bludge on Nickelodeon's 2008 holiday special, Merry Christmas, Drake & Josh. He also played an inmate named JC in 2009's fighting film Blood and Bone.

Personal life
In May 1994, Slice married L. Shontae, the mother of his children RaeChelle, Kevin II, and Kevinah. From this union, there are also three grandsons named Kevin III, Akieno, and Kimbo-Legacy, as well as one granddaughter named Isis. Kevin Jr. is also a mixed martial artist. Slice also had a son named Kevlar and a daughter named Kassandra. He also had two stepdaughters named Rae'Chelle (by his first wife) and Kiara. Before he died, he enjoyed spending time with two of his grandsons, K3 and JuJu (Akieno). Kimbo-Legacy and Isis were both born after Slice's death. At the time of his death, he was engaged to his long-time girlfriend.

Death
On June 5, 2016, Slice was admitted to a hospital in Margate, Florida. He died of congestive heart failure a day later, at the age of 42. An autopsy also revealed a mass on his liver.

Scott Coker, CEO of Bellator MMA, said, "We are all shocked and saddened by the devastating and untimely loss of Kimbo Slice, a beloved member of the Bellator family."

Professional boxing record

Mixed martial arts record

|-
|NC
|align=center|5–2 (1)
|Dada 5000
|NC (overturned)
|Bellator 149
|
|align=center|3
|align=center|1:32
|Houston, Texas, United States
|
|-
|Win
|align=center|5–2
|Ken Shamrock
|TKO (punches)
|Bellator 138
|
|align=center|1
|align=center|2:22
|St. Louis, Missouri, United States
|
|-
|Loss
|align=center|4–2
|Matt Mitrione
|TKO (punches)
|UFC 113
|
|align=center|2
|align=center|4:24
|Montreal, Quebec, Canada
|
|-
|Win
|align=center|4–1
|Houston Alexander
|Decision (unanimous)
|The Ultimate Fighter: Heavyweights Finale 
|
|align=center|3
|align=center|5:00
|Las Vegas, Nevada, United States
|
|-
|Loss
|align=center|3–1
|Seth Petruzelli
|TKO (punches)
|EliteXC: Heat
|
|align=center|1
|align=center|0:14
|Sunrise, Florida, United States
|
|-
|Win
|align=center|3–0
|James Thompson
|TKO (punches)
|EliteXC: Primetime
|
|align=center|3
|align=center|0:38
|Newark, New Jersey, United States
|
|-
|Win
|align=center|2–0
|Tank Abbott
|KO (punches)
|EliteXC: Street Certified
|
|align=center|1
|align=center|0:43
|Miami, Florida, United States
|
|-
|Win
|align=center|1–0
|Bo Cantrell
|TKO (submission to punches)
|EliteXC: Renegade
|
|align=center|1
|align=center|0:19
|Corpus Christi, Texas, United States
|

Mixed martial arts exhibition record

|-
|Loss
|align=center|1–1
|Roy Nelson
|TKO (punches)
|The Ultimate Fighter: Heavyweights
|
|align=center|2
|align=center|2:01
|Las Vegas, Nevada, United States
|
|-
|Win
|align=center|1–0
|Ray Mercer
|Submission (guillotine choke)
|Cage Fury Fighting Championships V
|
|align=center|1
|align=center|1:12
|Atlantic City, New Jersey, United States
|

Filmography

References

External links

 
 
 
 

1974 births
2016 deaths
American male mixed martial artists
American male professional wrestlers
American sportspeople in doping cases
Bahamian sportspeople in doping cases
Bahamian emigrants to the United States
Bahamian male boxers
Bahamian male mixed martial artists
Bare-knuckle boxers
Doping cases in mixed martial arts
Heavyweight boxers
Heavyweight mixed martial artists
Mixed martial artists utilizing boxing
Sportspeople from Nassau, Bahamas
University of Miami alumni
American male boxers
People from Coral Springs, Florida
People from Cutler Bay, Florida
Miami Palmetto Senior High School alumni
Ultimate Fighting Championship male fighters